Aradac is a village located in the Zrenjanin municipality, in the Central Banat District of Vojvodina, Serbia. The village is ethnically mixed and its population numbering 3,335 people (2011 census).

Name

In Serbo-Croatian, the village is known as Aradac (Арадац), in Slovak as Aradáč, in Hungarian as Aradi, and in German as Aradatz or Aradakurac.

Ethnic groups

1971
According to the 1971 census, ethnic Slovaks comprised 58.56% of population of the village.

2002
In 2002, the population of the village included:
 1,650 (47.67%) Serbs
 1,376 (39.76%) Slovaks
 96 (2.77%) Romani
 94 (2.72%) Hungarians
 49 (1.42%) Yugoslavs
 17 (0.49%) Croats
 179 (5.17%) others

Historical population

1961: 4,001
1971: 3,824
1981: 3,825
1991: 3,573
2002: 3,461
2011: 3,335

See also
List of places in Serbia
List of cities, towns and villages in Vojvodina

References
Slobodan Ćurčić, Broj stanovnika Vojvodine, Novi Sad, 1996.

Notes

Zrenjanin
Populated places in Central Banat District
Populated places in Serbian Banat